"Baby I'm a Star" is a song written and recorded by American musician Prince from his album Purple Rain. It is also the B-side on the "Take Me with U" single.

Release
"Baby I'm a Star" has been played live many times since its inception and was one of the songs Prince played during the Halftime Show of Super Bowl XLI. It was also in the original cut of Tim Burton's 1989 film Batman, used in the Joker's parade scene. However, when Prince agreed to compose the Batman soundtrack, he opted for the song to be replaced by "200 Balloons" (of which when rejected, turned up as a B-side on "Batdance") and later with "Trust", the latter of which seemed the most musically similar to "Baby I'm a Star", for both songs are about the same length, have a similar drum loop and lyrical pace. "Baby I'm a Star" is often played in sequence with "I Would Die 4 U", the track prior to it, on Purple Rain.

Personnel
 Prince – lead vocals, background vocals and various instruments
 Wendy Melvoin – guitar and vocals
 Lisa Coleman – keyboards and vocals
 Matt Fink – keyboards
 Brown Mark – bass
 Bobby Z. – drums and percussion
 Novi Novog – violin and viola
 David Coleman – cello
 Suzie Katayama – cello

Cover versions
2000: Tina Turner recorded a version which is included on Target-exclusive greatest hits All That Glitters. It was also included on her Twenty Four Seven Tour and Celebrate! – 60th Birthday Special setlists.
2006: American artist P. Diddy sampled the song on his song "Special Feeling", featuring singer Mika Lett, released on his album Press Play.
2009: A cover by Craig Wedren was included on the Prince tribute compilation Purplish Rain. A free download of the song was offered by Spin magazine.

References

 4. ^http://www.princevault.com/index.php?title=Baby_I%27m_A_Star

1984 songs
Prince (musician) songs
Songs written by Prince (musician)
American hard rock songs
Song recordings produced by Prince (musician)